The Tombs is a 1991 Argentine drama film directed by Javier Torre. The film was selected as the Argentine entry for the Best Foreign Language Film at the 64th Academy Awards, but was not accepted as a nominee.

Cast
 Norma Aleandro as Maria
 Federico Luppi as Espiga
 Jorge Mayor as La Gaita
 Isabel Quinteros as Rosita
 Lidia Catalano as Sara
 Sara Benítez as Gaucha
 Miguel Dedovich as Padre Roque
 Pompeyo Audivert as Remolacha

See also
 List of submissions to the 64th Academy Awards for Best Foreign Language Film
 List of Argentine submissions for the Academy Award for Best Foreign Language Film

References

External links
 

1991 films
1991 drama films
Argentine drama films
1990s Spanish-language films
1990s Argentine films